Elizabeth Cecilia van Zyl (22 April 1894 – 9 May 1901) was a South African child inmate of the Bloemfontein concentration camp who died from typhoid fever during the Second Anglo-Boer War.

Background 

Lizzie and her mother (Elizabeth Cecilia van Zyl) were inmates of the Bloemfontein concentration camp. They were labelled as 'undesirables', and placed on the lowest food rations because her father, Hermanus Egbert Pieter van Zyl, had refused to surrender.

Anti-war activist Emily Hobhouse used her death as an example of the hardships the Boer civilians faced in the concentration camps set up to intern them during the war. She describes Lizzie as "a frail, weak little child in desperate need of good care". Initially, the publishers of Hobhouse's reports refused to publish the photograph.

Lizzie died in 1901 at seven years of age.

Photo 

The photo of the emaciated van Zyl reportedly was sent from British author Arthur Conan Doyle, who served as a volunteer doctor during the Boer War, to Joseph Chamberlain. Both Doyle and Chamberlain were ostensibly proponents of the Boer Wars, at least publicly; Doyle wrote a short work The War in South Africa: Its Cause and Conduct, that set forth his reasoning for supporting the war. The photo was allegedly used as propaganda, not as directly anti-war propaganda, but to support the false notion that Boer children were neglected by their parents.

The image was released with the detail that it was taken when van Zyl and her mother entered the camp. Chamberlain was quoted in The Times on 5 March 1902, saying that Lizzie's mother was prosecuted for mistreatment.

Emily Hobhouse investigated the case and was unable to find any evidence of a case or the prosecution of Lizzie's mother for neglect. She located the photographer, a man named de Klerk, who was also a camp inmate at the time, and de Klerk stated that the photograph was taken two months after Lizzie had arrived at the camp, not when they had just arrived.

References 

1894 births
1901 deaths
Afrikaner people
Prisoners who died in British military detention
Child abuse resulting in death
Date of birth unknown
Place of birth missing
Deaths from typhoid fever
Second Boer War casualties
Orange Free State people
Child deaths